University of Stellenbosch Business School (USB) is the business school of the University of Stellenbosch in Bellville, Western Cape, South Africa.

History
The University of Stellenbosch Business School was founded in 1964, enrolling 14 MBA students. Four years later the first DBA degree was conferred. In 1981 the current premises in Bellville, northern Cape Town, was acquired and five years later the department relocated from Stellenbosch to the Bellville Park Campus. Through the years, more programmes have been added, such as an MPhil in Development Finance in 2003. Programmes in Management Coaching, Futures Studies, Leadership and Project Management followed. Stellenbosch University's business school was the first school from an African university to receive Triple Accreditation – EQUIS (first accredited in 2001), AMBA (first accredited in 2002), and AACSB (first accredited in 2012).

Location
The hilltop campus of the business school is situated in Bellville, about halfway between Cape Town's central business district and the town of Stellenbosch – home of the school's mother institution, Stellenbosch University.

Publications and journals
The business school manages two journals:

 South African Journal of Business Management
 Journal for Studies in Economics and Econometrics (in collaboration with the Bureau for Economic Research, and the Department of Economics, Stellenbosch University)

The business school also publishes the online magazine USB Management Review. The publication contains narrative articles extracted from the school's research.

Postgraduate programmes 
The University of Stellenbosch Business School offers a number of postgraduate programmes:

 MBA – Master of Business Administration
 PhD and PGDip in Business Administration
 PGDip, MPhil and PhD in Development Finance
 PGDip, MPhil and PhD in Futures Studies (IFR)
 MPhil in Management Coaching
 PGDip in Leadership Development
 PGDip in Project Management
 PGDip in Financial Planning
 Short Courses (USB-ED)

MBA programme options
 MBA with two formats and four streams
The MBA of Stellenbosch University's Business School is offered in two flexible formats, namely modular (blocks of classes spread over time) and blended learning (combination of on-campus blocks with regular classes that can be attended online or on campus).

The content of the MBA is strongly focused on responsible leadership, contemporary decision-making skills, and gaining a global perspective of business management with unique African contextualisation.

The four focal areas (streams) are the generalist MBA, MBA in Health Care Leadership, MBA in the Management of International Organisations, and MBA in Project Management.
 Modular MBA
The Modular MBA consists of blocks of classes spread over two years. Each block runs from the Monday to the Saturday. This allows students to study while they work, with in-class experience and focused studies without work interruptions.
 Blended Learning MBA 
The blended learning MBA comprises compulsory on-campus blocks as well as classes that can be attended either online (delivered synchronously with the on-campus classes) or on campus in person. This allows students to study while they work, with the flexibility of digital class attendance, which means minimum time away from work.

Research centres
The business school hosts four research centres, focusing on Futures Studies, Dispute Settlement, Development Finance, and Responsible Leadership Studies.

Small Business Academy 
Founded in 2012, the Small Business Academy is one of the ways in which the business school reinvests in society. The SBA offers a nine-month programme to small-business owners from low-income communities in South Africa to help them grow their businesses. A key feature of the programme is the mentorship provided by alumni of the school. The SBA also undertakes research on small-business development.

Sustainability and social involvement

Stellenbosch University's Business School endorses the importance of responsible business and management education. The school is a member of various global organisations focused on the role of business in society, and responsible management education and research. The school, through its Social Impact Division and other platforms, is involved in various projects aimed at thought leadership, capacity building and practical engagement in this field.

References

External links
 Official website of Stellenbosch University Business School
 Official website of Stellenbosch University
South African Journal of Business Management
Journal for Studies in Economics and Econometrics
USB Executive Development (USB-ED)

Business schools in South Africa
Stellenbosch University